The Ontario Power Authority (OPA) was an independent, non-profit corporation established through the Electricity Restructuring Act, 2004 (Bill 100). Licensed by the Ontario Energy Board, it reported to the Ontario legislature through the Ministry of Energy.

The OPA was responsible for: 
 Assessing the long-term adequacy of electricity resources on Ontario   
 Forecasting future demand and the potential for conservation and renewable energy 
 Preparing an integrated system plan for conservation, generation, transmission 
 Procuring new supply, transmission and demand management either by competition or by contract, when necessary 
 Achieving the targets set by government for conservation and renewable energy.

In April 2012, the Energy Minister of Ontario Christopher Bentley introduced legislation in Parliament to merge the Ontario Power Authority and the Independent Electricity System Operator. Ontario Power Authority merged with IESO on January 1, 2015.

See also
 Ontario Hydro
 Independent Electricity System Operator

References

External links

Ontario Ministry of Energy
Independent Electricity System Operator
Ontario Electricity Financial Corporation
Ontario Energy Board
Ontario Power Generation

Ontario electricity policy
Ontario Hydro
Defunct Ontario government departments and agencies
2015 disestablishments in Ontario
2004 establishments in Ontario